Jean Baptiste Carnoy (11 January 1836 – 6 September 1899), born in Rumillies (Belgium), was a Roman Catholic priest and a scientist in the field of cytology. He made the initial explanation of the real nature of the albuminoid membrane, and conducted noted experiments on cellular segmentation.

See also
List of Roman Catholic scientist-clerics

References 
 1910 New Catholic Dictionary
 Catholic Encyclopedia

19th-century Belgian Roman Catholic priests
Belgian biologists
1836 births
1899 deaths
Catholic clergy scientists